Mardin Sign Language is a family sign language of Turkey. It was originally spoken in the town of Mardin, dating back at least five generations in a single extended family. All speakers now live in Izmir or Istanbul, and the younger generation has shifted to Turkish Sign Language.

References

Village sign languages
Sign languages of Turkey